Delta Motors can mean any of the following:

 Delta Motors Corporation, a now defunct automobile company from the Philippines
 Delta Motor Corporation, now a fully owned subsidiary of General Motors South Africa
 Delta Motor Car Company, a defunct automobile company from the United States
 Delta Motorsport
 Delta Veicoli Speciali, a defunct automobile company from Turin, Italy
 In Israel, Dacia vehicles were sold between 1978 and 1989 under the "Delta" brand.